Dariyapur Bilhaur is a village and Gram panchayat in Bilhaur Tehsil, Kanpur Nagar district, Uttar Pradesh, India. It is located 53 km towards North from Kanpur City. As per 2011 Census of India report the population of the village is 1,734 where 883 are men and 851 are women.

References

Villages in Kanpur Nagar district